Ganesan known professionally as Delhi Ganesh is an Indian actor who mostly acts in supporting roles in Tamil cinema and serials.He is the periyappa of Manjukesh. He has acted in more than 400 films from 1976 to present. Before films, he was a member of the Delhi-based theatre troupe, Dakshina Bharata Nataka Sabha. Ganesh served in the Indian Air Force from 1964 to 1974 before quitting in favour of films. He was given the stage name Delhi Ganesh by K. Balachander.

Career
He was introduced to Tamil Film Industry by K. Balachander in the film Pattina Pravesam (1976). Ganesh played the hero in the 1981 film Engamma Maharani. His most popular roles have been as a supporting actor or a comedian, but he has also played villainous roles in films like Apoorva Sagodharargal (1989).

He won the Tamil Nadu State Film Award Special Prize for his performance in Pasi (1979). He also received various state awards like Kalaimamani (1994) given by the then Chief Minister J. Jayalalithaa.

His most notable films are Sindhu Bhairavi (1985), Nayakan (1987), Michael Madana Kama Rajan (1990), Aahaa..! (1997) and Thenali (2000). 35 years after Nayakan, Ganesh reprised his role of Iyer in Gautham Vasudev Menon's gangster-drama film Vendhu Thanindhathu Kaadu. 

Delhi Ganesh also appeared in TV serials and Short films.

He also made an appearance in the short film What if Batman was from Chennai as a version of Alfred Pennyworth. In 2016, he had a brief role as Sriman (the man who lodges complaint about his missing son, only later to find out that his son is dead) in Dhuruvangal Pathinaaru under Karthick Naren's direction alongside Rahman. In 2015, he launched his first production venture, Ennul Aayiram (2016) which would star his son Maha in the leading role.

Filmography

Films

Dubbing artist

Television

Serials

Web series

Dubbing artist

References

External links
 The Hindu article

Tamil male actors
Indian male television actors
Indian male film actors
Living people
1944 births
People from Tirunelveli district
Tamil Nadu State Film Awards winners
Recipients of the Kalaimamani Award
Indian Air Force personnel
Tamil male television actors
Television personalities from Tamil Nadu
Male actors from Tamil Nadu
Male actors in Tamil cinema